Events from the year 1923 in Denmark.

Incumbents
 Monarch - Christian X
 Prime minister - Niels Neergaard

Events

 13 July – Niels Hansen Jacobsen's Troll Fountain is inaugurated in Vejen.

Sports

Undated
 Frem wins their first Danish football championship by defeating Aarhus Gymnastikforening 21 in the final of the 1922–23 Danish National Football Tournament.

Births
 2 January – Poul Volther, furniture designer (d. 2011)

Deaths
 7 February  – Kristine Marie Jensen, cookbook writer (b. 1858)
 26 March – Olaf Poulsen, comedic stage actor (b. 1849)
 3 May – Carl Ryder, Arctic explorer and naval officer (b. 1858)
 13 July – Asger Hamerik, composer (b. 1843)
 27 November – Tage Reedtz-Thott, politician, prime minister of Denmark (b. 1839)
 21 December – Knud Rasmussen, polar explorer, anthropologist (b. 1879)

References

 
Denmark
Years of the 20th century in Denmark
1920s in Denmark
Denmark